Stella Aba Seal is a Ghanaian female gospel musician.

Early life
Stella was born to Mr. Theophilus Seal of British and Cameroonian parentage and Madam Violet Addo from Anum Boso in the Eastern Region of Ghana.

Education
Stella started her basic education at the Accra New Town 4 School in Accra New Town, a suburb of Accra, and then proceeded to Kotobabi 2 Middle School also in Kotobabi, a suburb of Accra. She furthered her education at Accra Polytechnic, where she trained as a secretary after her GCE ‘O’ levels in 1981 at the City Secondary and Business College at Caprice in Accra.

Personal life
Seal was previously known as Stella Dugan, her marital name. She has about three children with her ex-husband. Dugan reverted to her maiden name after her divorce.

References

Living people
Ghanaian gospel singers
Ghanaian women singers
Year of birth missing (living people)
Accra Technical University alumni